Razina Islam is a Bangladeshi politician who served as a member of the Jatiya Sangsad, Bangladesh's parliament, from a reserved seat. She was elected to parliament in 2005. Islam is a member of the Bangladesh Nationalist Party.

References

Bangladesh Nationalist Party politicians
Living people
Women members of the Jatiya Sangsad
8th Jatiya Sangsad members
Year of birth missing (living people)
21st-century Bangladeshi women politicians